Vrbno may refer to:

 Vrbno pod Pradědem, a town in the Czech Republic
 Vrbno nad Lesy, a village in the Czech Republic
 Vrbno (Hořín), a village in the Czech Republic
 Vrbno, Šentjur, a village in Slovenia
 Vrbno, Croatia, a village near Bednja, Croatia